Vyazovka is a rural locality (a village) in Bik-Karmalinsky Selsoviet, Davlekanovsky District, Bashkortostan, Russia. The population was 16 as of 2010. There is 1 street.

Geography 
Vyazovka is located 23 km southeast of Davlekanovo (the district's administrative centre) by road. Bakhcha is the nearest rural locality.

References 

Rural localities in Davlekanovsky District